Dipterocarpus lowii is a tree in the family Dipterocarpaceae.

Description
The bark is chocolate-brown.

Distribution and habitat
Dipterocarpus lowii is native to Sumatra, Peninsular Malaysia and Borneo. Its habitat is mixed dipterocarp forest, also on rocks, from sea level to  altitude.

Conservation
Dipterocarpus lowii has been assessed as near threatened on the IUCN Red List. The species is threatened by logging and conversion of land for palm oil plantations and pulp wood. Subpopulations in Kalimantan and Sumatra are threatened by fires.

References

lowii
Trees of Sumatra
Trees of Peninsular Malaysia
Trees of Borneo
Plants described in 1860

Near threatened flora of Asia
Taxa named by Joseph Dalton Hooker